Jespersen is a Danish and Norwegian patronymic surname that may refer to:

People
Anna Jespersen (1895–1989), American geologist
Chris Jespersen (born 1983), Norwegian cross-country skier
Eric Jespersen (born 1961), Canadian sailor
Finn Varde Jespersen (1914–44), Norwegian orienteer
Helle Jespersen (born 1968), Danish competitive sailor
Karen Jespersen (born 1947), Danish politician
Knud Jespersen (1926–77), Danish politician
Mogens Jespersen (born 1949), Danish soccer player 
Otto Jespersen (1860–1943), Danish linguist
Otto Jespersen (comedian) (born 1954), Norwegian comedian and satirist
Per Mathias Jespersen (1888–1964), Norwegian gymnast
Ralph Jespersen (born 1925), Canadian dairyman and politician

Other
Murders of Louisa Vesterager Jespersen and Maren Ueland, a 2018 crime that occurred in Morocco
Jespersen's Cycle, process of grammaticalization named in recognition of Otto Jespersen’s pioneering work

See also 
Jesperson
Jespersen v. Harrah's

Danish-language surnames
Norwegian-language surnames
Patronymic surnames
Surnames from given names